David Paterson is a New York politician.

David Paterson may also refer to:

David Paterson (academic) (born 1959), British physiologist and academic
David L. Paterson, screenwriter, actor and producer
David Paterson (South Dakota politician), one of the Members of the South Dakota State Senate

See also
David Patterson (disambiguation)
David Peterson (disambiguation)